Visa fraud has different criteria in various parts of the world but the commonly accepted points are the sale, provision, or transfer of otherwise legitimate visas, misrepresentation of reasons for traveling and forgery or alteration of a visa.

The United States reports that most cases of visa fraud are related to immigrants lying about their situation to seek refuge in the country, though smuggling and terrorism are also both key factors in the crime.

In the United States, visa fraud can be prosecuted under several statutes, including;
 18 USC 1546  Fraud and Misuse of Visas, Permits, and Other Documents
 18 USC 1001 False Statements or Entries Generally
 18 USC 1028 Fraud in Connection with Identification Documents

It is a federal offense subject to harsh sentencing, though mitigating factors are often taken into account in the case of potential immigrants.  The maximum penalties faced by fraudsters are recounted below.

 10 years for a first offense not tied to terrorism or drug trafficking
 15 years for fraud with other criminal links
 20 years for fraud related to drug trafficking
 25 years for fraud related to international terrorism

See also
Diplomatic Security Service
FBI
Federal crime
Fraud
Human trafficking
Illegal immigration
Immigration and Customs Enforcement (ICE)
Interpol
People smuggling
Sham marriage
United States Border Patrol
United States Customs and Border Protection (CBP)
White collar crime

Fraud
Human migration
Fraud